Steendijkpolder is a metro station on Line B of the Rotterdam Metro located in Maassluis, South Holland.  The station entered regular service on 30 September 2019, with a preview service operated on 28 September 2019. Whereas located on the Hoekse Lijn, converted from a railway, this is the only station of the line which never was a railway station and was constructed in 2019.

Steendijkpolder consists of a side platform for westbound services toward Hook of Holland (Hoek van Holland), and an island platform with two tracks used by eastbound services toward Nesselande.

Services
As of 2019, 3 trains per hour operate on Line B through Steendijkpolder between Hoek van Holland Haven and Nesseland, and an additional 3 trains per hour operate only between Steendijkpolder and Nesselande.  Services terminating at Steendijkpolder use the centre track while the outer tracks are used by through services.

References

Rotterdam Metro stations
Railway stations on the Hoekse Lijn
Railway stations opened in 2019
2019 establishments in the Netherlands
Maassluis
Railway stations in the Netherlands opened in the 21st century